Raphaël Mapou  (born 9 October 1955 as part of the Unia Tribe in Yaté) is a New Caledonian separatist and Kanak politician. He is the former spokesperson for the Kanak Liberation Party from 1989 to 1998 and was the mayor of Yaté from 1990 to 1995. Mapou was a founding member of the Federation of Pro-Independence Co-operation Committees (FCCI) from 1998 to 2002 and with the FCCI he participated in the second government of New Caledonia that resulted from the Nouméa Accord, chaired by Pierre Frogier, from October 17, 2001, to July 29, 2002. He has been the general secretary of the Comité Rhéébù Nùù since its creation in 2001.

References 

1955 births
Living people
Kanak people
Kanak and Socialist National Liberation Front politicians
Separatists
People from South Province, New Caledonia